George Becker may refer to:

 George Becker (labor leader)  (1928–2007), American steelworker and president of the United Steelworkers
 George Becker (politician) (1877–1941), Australian politician
 George Becker (composer) (1834–1928), German-Swiss composer and writer on music
 George Becker (musician) (born 1963), American musician
 George Ferdinand Becker (1847–1919), American geologist
 George Loomis Becker (1829–1904), lawyer and mayor of Saint Paul, Minnesota